was a Japanese professional golfer.

Kitta played on the Japan Golf Tour, winning twice. He won a dozen tournaments in Japan prior to the formation of the Japan Golf Tour and also won the Thailand Open in 1966.

Professional wins (27)

Japan Golf Tour wins (2)
1974 Chubu Open
1977 Japan PGA Match-Play Championship

Far East Circuit wins (1)
1966 Thailand Open

Other wins (20)
1957 Kansai Pro Championship
1958 Kansai Open
1960 Yomiuri Pro Championship
1962 Chunichi Crowns, Kansai Open
1963 Japan PGA Championship, Kansai Open
1964 Japan PGA Championship, Golden Match
1965 Japan Open, Chunichi Crowns, Golden Match, Woodlawn Invitational
1966 Kansai Pro Championship, Kuzuha International
1967 Japan Open
1968 West Japan Circuit Shimonoseki leg
1969 Kuzuha International
1971 Rolex Tournament
1972 Chubu Open

Senior wins (4)
1985 Kansai Pro Senior Championship
1986 Japan PGA Senior Championship, Kansai Pro Senior Championship
1994 Kansai Pro Grand Senior

Team appearances
Canada Cup (representing Japan): 1962, 1963, 1964, 1965

References

External links

Japan PGA Hall of Fame 

Japanese male golfers
Japan Golf Tour golfers
Sportspeople from Hyōgo Prefecture
1934 births
2003 deaths